The Salang is a 438 kilometre long river of Afghanistan, flowing through Parwan Province. It is a tributary of the Indus River and the Ghorband River and the Panjshir River and the Kabul River.

Geography

The Salang River originates on the south side of the central mountains of the Hindu Kush in the north-east of Salang Pass, which links the region to Kabul with the northern part of the country.

Its valley and the Salang Pass form an important international waterway. It is north–south oriented. The Salang flows into the Ghorband River at the locality of Jabal Saraj in Parwan. In Jabal Saraj, the average annual flow module between 1961 and 1964 was about 763 millimeters per year, which is considered a high rate.

References

Rivers of Afghanistan
Landforms of Parwan Province